Langli station can refer to:
Langli station (Changsha Maglev), a maglev station on Changsha Maglev Express. Located in Changsha, China.
Langli Station, a railway station in Langli, Ski, Norway.